Martha Lucía Mícher Camarena, also known as Malú Mícher (born 11 February 1954), is a Mexican politician affiliated with National Regeneration Movement. She is currently a senator representing the state of Guanajuato in the LXIV Legislature of the Mexican Congress.

Life

She has a degree in Pedagogy from the Universidad Panamericana, has participated in several organizations of the left and fought for the equality of women, among them several organized by the Socialist International on behalf of the Party of the Democratic Revolution and member of the Mexican delegation to the World Conference of Women held in Beijing, China.

Micher ran for Governor of Guanajuato in 1995, coming in third to Vicente Fox and PRI candidate Ignacio Vázquez Torres, but obtaining an important influence for its party, practically nonexistent before her candidacy. Micher was a deputy in the Guanajuato state legislature, from 1997 to 2000, running that year for Municipal President of León.

From 2000 to 2002 she was the women's secretary of the National Executive Committee of the PRD.

From 2003 to 2006 and again between 2012 and 2015, she was a federal deputy in the LIX Legislature and in the LXII Legislature of the Mexican Congress, representing the Federal District. She left the PRD for Morena in 2015 and won election to the Senate from Guanajuato in 2018.

References

1954 births
Living people
Politicians from Mexico City
Women members of the Chamber of Deputies (Mexico)
Members of the Chamber of Deputies (Mexico) for Mexico City
Morena (political party) politicians
20th-century Mexican politicians
20th-century Mexican women politicians
21st-century Mexican politicians
21st-century Mexican women politicians
Members of the Congress of Guanajuato
Panamerican University alumni
Deputies of the LIX Legislature of Mexico
Deputies of the LXII Legislature of Mexico
Members of the Senate of the Republic (Mexico) for Guanajuato
Women members of the Senate of the Republic (Mexico)